is a Japanese manga series written and illustrated by Yuto and published by Square Enix. The series follows Anzu, a kindergarten girl who is in love with her teacher and tries to win his affection but always fails. It has been adapted into an anime television series animated by Gainax and broadcast in Japan from January to March 2010.

Plot
Anzu goes to a kindergarten with her friends, the shy Koume and the eccentric Hiiragi. Together they try to attract attention from their caretaker Tsuchida Naozumi. However, he is clearly more interested in the pretty Yamamoto Nanako, a fellow kindergarten teacher who supervises the class next door. Though Anzu tries to convince Tsuchida to marry her when she grows up, Tsuchida is trying to have a date with Yamamoto; or if not, get engaged with her.

Characters

Teachers 
 
Voiced by: Satoshi Hino
 Tsuchida-sensei is the only male teacher at Hanamaru Kindergarten, who started teaching in the school immediately after he graduated. At first, he is seen as unreliable, but as time passes, he gets the hang of being a teacher. He is a game otaku and plays games until late at night, often resulting in him being late for work at the kindergarten where he teaches the students of the first-year Sakura Class. Anzu develops a crush on him, but, understandably, he does not reciprocate although he does like her as he does all of his students. Anzu's mother, Sakura, called him Tsuchi when they were children (she still does), and so Anzu does as well. It is revealed in episode 7 of the anime, that he had a crush on Sakura when they were in high school. Tsuchida now has a crush on his colleague, Nanako Yamamoto. He is nicknamed "breast man" because of his habit of looking at girl model magazines and often staring at Yamamoto-Sensei's chest. In the end, the children at the kindergarten help him muster the courage to confess and he begins a relationship with Yamamoto-Sensei.
 
Voiced by: Erino Hazuki
 Yamamoto-sensei is one of the female teachers at Hanamaru Kindergarten. Even though Tsuchida likes her, she does not understand that men would fall for her. She teaches the students of first-year Peach Class. She appears to be good at sewing, as she mended Tsuchida's apron and Koume's stuffed panda-cat doll's ear. Despite her obliviousness towards romance involving her, she is aware of the fact that Hanamaru-sensei has a crush on her sister, Mayumi. Eventually, she begins to develop feelings towards Tsuchida and starts to express a greater interest in romance.
 
Voiced by: Kaoru Mizuhara
 Kusano-sensei is one of the female teachers at Hanamaru Kindergarten. She likes sports and muscular men. She enjoys watching what Tsuchida does to get Yamamoto's attention. She teaches the students of second-year Sunflower Class. She was Koume's coach and helped her to train for the school sports day's footrace.
 
Voiced by: Naomi Wakabayashi
 Kawashiro-sensei is one of the female teachers at Hanamaru Kindergarten who appears slightly geeky. She teaches the students of second-year Tulip Class. In the anime, she lent Anzu a sweater for her "date" with Tsuchida. She is described as lacking composure.
 
Voiced by: Arisa Ogasawara
 Kakogawa-sensei is one of the female teachers at Hanamaru Kindergarten. She has short brown hair. She is described as being mature.
 
Voiced by: Ayumi Tsunematsu
 Nishikaze-sensei is one of the female teachers at Hanamaru Kindergarten. She has long black hair that goes to her waist and is described as being laid back. She has a sleepy look on her face.

Kindergarten students 

Voiced by: Kei Shindō
 Anzu is a girl in Tsuchida's class and the main protagonist of the series. She is the daughter of his childhood friend and calls him "Tsuchi", like her mother does. She has a crush on Tsuchida and, with her mother's encouragement, plans to marry him although her efforts to get his attention fail. She is friends with Koume and Hiiragi and is known to get into troublesome, and even dangerous situations, much to the consternation of her teachers. She has a wild strand of blond hair that sticks up.

Voiced by: MAKO
 Koume is a very shy, timid, and sensitive girl in Tsuchida's class. She quickly became friends with Anzu and Hiiragi upon the start of the semester. She has an older brother who gave her a red ribbon which she holds very dear to her heart. Her dream in the future is to open a cake shop. She has a crush on Yū.

Voiced by: Ayahi Takagaki
 Hiiragi, or Hii-chan to her friends, is a girl in Tsuchida's class. She has blue hair, and big blank eyes of the same color. She quickly became friends with Anzu and Koume upon the start of the semester. She is very intelligent and knowledgeable but is easily embarrassed. Her father, who calls her Hii, works at a scientific lab. She wears random costumes in certain episodes, and when someone compliments them, she acts out the costume she is wearing. Her mouth isn't shown, even when she talks. Her dream in the future is to become an astronaut despite having to potentially study abroad and away from her friends, though she assures Anzu and Koume that she will always come back to them and they will remain friends. She has a crush on Kenji.

Voiced by: Hiromi Igarashi
 Yū is a boy who once helped Koume when she fell down and as a result Koume starts to like him. He's in the second-year Sunflower Class. In the anime, when the children return from summer break, he gives her a stuffed koala doll.

Voiced by: Manami Numakura
 Kenji is a boy from second-year Sunflower Class who challenged Hiiragi to see who was smarter and lost, prompting him to start calling her "master" and decide to be her student. He develops a crush on her.

Voiced by: Mariya Ise
 Hinagiku is a girl whom Tsuchida helped. She falls in love with him and enrolls in Hanamaru Kindergarten to be close to him. She is placed in the second-year Sunflower Class. Hinagiku is surprisingly very mature considering her age, and is the daughter of the head of a yakuza clan (whose members highly respect her). Anzu considers her to be a rival, but she treats her kindly.

Voiced by: Hiromi Igarashi
 Aoi is a girl in Tsuchida's class. Her parents are fishmongers, and she is proud of them, and likes to help them with the business. She appears both in the anime and manga.

Others 

Voiced by: Yōko Honna
 Sakura is Anzu's mother and Tsuchida's childhood friend who is a year or so older than him. She encourages Anzu in her desire to marry Tsuchida (a reflection of her own marriage to her Art teacher). She got married and pregnant while in high school and did not graduate (despite having only one term to finish) because she dropped out to be with her husband-() when he got a job teaching at an American university. She has a wild strand of blond hair that sticks up, which Anzu seems to have inherited. Despite no longer being students, Tsuchida still calls her Senpai.

Voiced by: Shion Hirota
 Satsuki is Naozumi's younger sister. She visits the kindergarten to see how Tsuchida has been doing ever since he left home. She seems to care very much for her brother's well-being, and apparently has a brother complex. She is often very eager to receive any sort of acknowledgment from Tsuchida and has a tendency to get jealous whenever Tsuchida gets close to Yamamoto. She possesses exceptional culinary skill.

Voiced by: Chiwa Saitō
 Mayumi is Nanako's younger sister. She works as a part-time assistant for a manga publisher and deals with a manga artist named Hanamaru, who has a crush on her. She is rather mischievous at times when it comes to her sister, but the two are very close. She knows that her sister is very airheaded when it comes to matters of love. She is also aware that Tsuchida has a crush on her sister, and sympathizes with him, knowing that he'll have a hard time trying to get through to her. She is similarly obtuse when it comes to people's affections aimed at herself (Hanamaru-sensei in particular).

Voiced by: Kōji Yusa
Hanamaru is a manga artist, the author of the manga entitled "Panda-cat", which is a hit with kindergarten children. He has a crush on his assistant, Mayumi Yamamoto.

Media

Manga
The manga is written and illustrated by Yuto. Hanamaru Kindergarten was serialized by Square Enix in the bimonthly Young Gangan magazine, and the chapters collected in tankōbon. Eleven volumes were released with the first one released on April 25, 2007, and the last one on 24 December 2011. Additionally, a fanbook with volume number 7.5 was released on February 25, 2010.

Outside Japan the series is licensed in Taiwan by Sharp Point Press and in Hong Kong and Macau by Jade Dynasty.

Volume list

Anime

References

External links 
 Official manga Square Enix webpage 
 Hanamaru Kindergarten at StarChild  
 Hanamaru Kindergarten  at TV Tokyo  
 Hanamaru Kindergarten at Gainax 
 

2010 anime television series debuts
2010 Japanese television series endings
Comedy anime and manga
Gainax
Gangan Comics manga
School life in anime and manga
Seinen manga
Slice of life anime and manga
TV Tokyo original programming
Sharp Point Press titles
Square Enix franchises